Tiakadougou-Dialakoro  is a village and rural commune in the Cercle of Kati in the Koulikoro Region of south-western Mali. The commune covers an area of 327 square kilometers and includes 9 villages. In the 2009 census it had a population of 6,738.

References

External links
.

Communes of Koulikoro Region